The 2004–05 Moldovan "A" Division season is the 14th since its establishment. A total of 16 teams are contesting the league.

League table

References

External links
 Moldova. Second Level 2004/05 - RSSSF
 "A" Division - moldova.sports.md

Moldovan Liga 1 seasons
2
Moldova